Aşağıköy (literally "lower village") is a Turkish place name that may refer to the following places in Turkey:

 Aşağıköy, Bilecik, a village in the central district (Bilecik) of Bilecik Province
 Aşağıköy, Ulus, a village in the district of Ulus, Bartın Province